Sitamarhi is one of the districts in the Mithila region of the Indian state of Bihar, India. Dumra is the administrative headquarters of this district. The district is a part of the Tirhut Division and is located along the border of Nepal.

History
This place is considered as birthplace of Sita, the main character of the epic Ramayana and a temple dedicated to Sita lies near Sitamarhi town. A Rock cut sanctuary of Mauryan period is found near Sitamarhi.

In 1875, a Sitamarhi subdistrict was created within the Muzaffarpur district. Sitmarhi was detached from Muzaffarpur and became a separate district as of 11 December 1972. It is situated in the northern part of Bihar. The district headquarters is located in Dumra, five kilometers south of Sitamarhi.

Sitamarhi district became a full-fledged district when it was split from Muzaffarpur district in 1972. 1994 saw the split of Sheohar district from Sitamarhi.

The district is currently a part of the Red Corridor.

Communal riots 
Sitamarhi district has a history of communal riots dating back to the partition of India. In 1948, violence broke out in Belsand, following by riots in 1959 over issue of the Mahavir Flag; roughly 50 people, mostly Muslims, were killed. Further violence occurred around the issue of Durga Mela - these riots began after a false rumour that Muslims had slaughtered a cow, which was eventually found alive. Another riot in 1959 on the issue of cow slaughter killed 11 people, again mostly Muslims, and destroyed 200 houses. Subsequent riots occurred in 1967, 1968, 1969, and 1989.

Geography

It is bordered by Nepal to the north, Madhubani district to the east, Darbhanga and Muzaffarpur districts to the south, and Sheohar and East Champaran districts to the west.

It is situated on a flood plain. In August 2019, Sitamarhi district suffered heavy flooding.

Politics 
  

|}

Block

Economy
It is one of the 38 districts in Bihar currently receiving funds from the Backward Regions Grant Fund Programme (BRGF).

Education

The following is a list of Schools in Sitamarhi, Bihar, India
 Golden bharti public school , sitamarhi 
 D.A.V. Public school, runnisaidpur
 S.R Dav public school, pupri
 Saraswati vidya mandir, Pupri 
 Sitamarhi Central school, Simra 
Kendriya Vidyalaya Jawahar Nagar, Sutihara
Janki Vidya Niketan
 Sacred Heart School
 Thakur Yugal Kishore Singh College, Pratap Nagar
 Saraswati Vidya Mandir, Ring bandh
 N.S.D.A.V. Public School
 Hellen's School Sitamarhi
 Delhi Public School, Lagma
 Brilliant Public School, Sitamarhi
 R.O.S. Public School, Khairwa, Riga Road, Sitamarhi
 Mathura High School
 Sri Gandhi High School, Parihar
 Lakshmi High School
 Kamala–Girls High School
 Idaa Dawatul Haque, Madhopur Sultanpur, Runni Saidpur
 Jamia Islamia Quasmia Darululoom Balasath

Tourism
 Sita Kund
 Haleshwar Sthan
 Panth Pakar

Transport
National Highway 77 connects the area to the Muzaffarpur district and Patna to the South. Sitamarhi has road connections to adjoining districts, of which the major examples are National Highway 77 and National Highway 104. It is situated on the Darbhanga Narkatiaganj railway line and has the largest railway station of the district. Another broad gauge track, running between Muzaffarpur and Sitamarhi. Direct train services are available to places such as New Delhi, Kolkata, Varanasi, Hyderabad and Kanpur. State highways link it to the Madhubani (to the east) and Sheohar (to the west) districts.  Railway lines connect Sitamarhi to Darbhanga in east, and to Muzaffarpur in the south and to Raxaul in the west. Sitamarhi has a railway junction. Sitamarhi railway station is on the Raxaul-Darbhanga rail route.

The nearest airport to Sitamarhi is the Darbhanga Airport which is about 70 km from Sitamarhi.

The Sitamarhi-Bhitthamore Road is important for religious reasons as it connects Janakpur, which houses a 200-year-old Janki Temple with Sitamarhi—considered to be the birth place of Goddess Sita.

National Highway 227 passes through Bhitthamore. Thus it is a gateway to Janakpur, Nepal and other parts of Sitamarhi & Madhubani.

Demographics

According to the 2011 census Sitamarhi district has a population of 3,423,574, roughly equal to the nation of Panama or the US state of Connecticut. This gives it a ranking of 96th in India (out of a total of 640). Its population growth rate over the decade 2001-2011 was  27.47%. Sitamarhi has a sex ratio of 899 females for every 1000 males, and a literacy rate of 53.53%. 5.56% of the population lives in urban areas. Scheduled Castes and Scheduled Tribes make up 11.85% and 0.09% of the population respectively.

At the time of the 2011 Census of India, 33.45% of the population in the district spoke Hindi, 13.96% Urdu and 3.25% Maithili as their first language. 49.14% of the population recorded their language as 'Others' under Hindi.  The main dialect of the region is the Bajjika dialect of Maithili.

Notable people
Thakur Jugal Kishore Sinha - Former MP & Freedom Fighter, Father of Co-operative Movement
Ram Dulari Sinha - Former Union Minister & Governor & Freedom Fighter, First woman from Bihar to become Governor
Nawal Kishore Rai - Ex Member of Parliament
Sitaram Yadav - Ex Member of Parliament
Ram Kumar Sharma - Indian politician and a former member of parliament from Sitamarhi Lok Sabha constituency, Bihar
Sunil Kumar Pintu - Member of parliament from Sitamarhi Lok Sabha constituency, Bihar
 Hrithik Vardhan (Actor)

References

External links
 
 Political Map of Sitamarhi District (showing subdistricts)
 Sitamarhi Information Portal

 
Tirhut division
Districts of Bihar
Minority Concentrated Districts in India
1972 establishments in Bihar